Stuck with a Perfect Woman is a 2016 Czech comedy film directed by Tomáš Hoffman.

Cast and characters
 Petra Hřebíčková as Eliška Vomáčková
 Ondřej Vetchý as Bohumil Šťastný
 Miroslav Táborský as Jaroslav Zezulka
 Jiří Langmajer as Pavel Vomáčka
 Tereza Kostková as Klára Vomáčková

References

External links
 

2016 comedy films
Czech comedy films